The men's 400 metres hurdles at the 2016 European Athletics Championships took place at the Olympic Stadium on 6, 7 and 8 July.

Records

Schedule

Results

Round 1

First 2 in each heat (Q) and the next fastest 4 (q) advance to the Semifinals.

Semifinals 

First 2 (Q) and next 2 fastest (q) qualify for the final.

*Athletes who received a bye to the semifinals

Final

References

External links
 amsterdam2016.org, official championship site.

Hurdles 400 M
400 metres hurdles at the European Athletics Championships